Davor Bagarić (born 8 September 1985) is a Croatian retired footballer who last played for Dinamo Apatija.

Club career
After coming out of the Cibalia youth academy, Bagarić debuted for the first team during the 2004–05 season in the Druga HNL, helping the team return to the top division. He remained a regular player in the team for the following five seasons in the top level, only missing parts of the 2008–09 and 2009–10 seasons due to injury. In the summer of 2010, he transferred to Slaven Belupo, where he gained a place in the first eleven after the first few rounds.

Bagarić moved abroad in the summer of 2011, signing for Slovenian team Koper, where he stayed for two seasons, before moving to Olimpija Ljubljana. His contract with Olimpija was terminated in November 2013.

In January 2014, he signed a contract with the Druga HNL team Inter Zaprešić.

References

External links

1985 births
Living people
Footballers from Osijek
Croatian footballers
HNK Cibalia players
NK Slaven Belupo players
FC Koper players
NK Olimpija Ljubljana (2005) players
NK Inter Zaprešić players
Croatian Football League players
Slovenian PrvaLiga players
First Football League (Croatia) players
Croatian expatriate footballers
Expatriate footballers in Slovenia
Croatian expatriate sportspeople in Slovenia
Croatia youth international footballers
Croatia under-21 international footballers
Association football fullbacks
Association football wingers